The Division of City Schools – Manila, or simply the DCS-Manila, is a division under the supervision of the Department of Education. It also refers to the three-tier public education system in Manila, Philippines.

The main office of the DCS-Manila is situated at the main building of the Universidad de Manila at the Mehan Garden. The DCS-Manila Superintendent is mandated by Republic Act No. 4196 (now the PLM Charter) to be a member of the six-man Board of Regents of the Pamantasan ng Lungsod ng Maynila.

The division has two local government-funded public universities, four state universities, 32 public high schools, 71 public elementary schools.

Public elementary and high schools

District 1
 Amado V. Hernandez Elementary School
 Arsenio H. Lacson Elementary School
 Emilio Jacinto Elementary School
 Isabelo delos Reyes Elementary School
 Jose Corazon de Jesus Elementary School
 Jose Rizal Elementary School
 Magat Salamat Elementary School
 Manuel L. Quezon Elementary School
 Rosauro Almario Elementary School
 Teodoro R. Yangco Elementary School
 Gen. Vicente Lim Elementary School
 Dr. Juan G. Nolasco High School
 Gregorio Perfecto High School
 Tondo High School
 Antonio J. Villegas Vocational High School
 Timoteo Paez Integrated School

District II
 Arsenio C. Herrera Elementary School
 Barrio Obrero Elementary School
 Francisco Benitez Elementary School
 Gregoria de Jesus Elementary School
 Gregorio del Pilar Elementary School
 Lakan Dula Elementary School
 Lapu-Lapu Elementary School
 Librada Avelino Elementary School
 Mariano Ponce Elementary School
 Gen. Maximino Hizon Elementary School
 Melchora Aquino Elementary School
 Plaridel Elementary School
 CENTEX Elementary School
 Felipe G. Calderon Elementary School
 Lakan Dula High School
 Jose P. Laurel High School
 Pres. Sergio Osmeña High school
 Manuel L. Quezon High School
 Florentino Torres High School
 Felipe G. Calderon High School

District III
 Andres Bonifacio Elementary School
 Antonio Luna Elementary School
 Apolinario Mabini Elementary School
 Antonio Regidor Elementary School
 Cecilio Apostol Elementary School
 Eriberto Remigio Elementary School
 Francisco Balagtas Elementary School
 Juan Sumulong Elementary School
 Marcela Agoncillo Elementary School
 Padre Mariano Gomez Elementary School
 Pedro Guevarra Elementary School
 Doña Teodora Alonzo High School
 Cayetano Arellano High School
 Ramon Avanceña High School
 Jose Abad Santos High School
 Raja Soliman Science and Technology High School

District IV
 Dr. Alejandro Albert Elementary School
 Benigno Aldana Elementary School
 Benito Legarda Elementary School
 Graciano Lopez-Jaena Elementary School
 Juan Luna Elementary School
 Gen. Licerio Geronimo Elementary School
 Laong Laan Elementary School
 Gen. Miguel Malvar Elementary School
 Moises Salvador Elementary School
 Padre Burgos Elementary School
 Pedro Pelaez Elementary School
 Trinidad Tecson Elementary School
 Esteban Abada High School
 Ramon Magsaysay High School
 Claro M. Recto High School
 Valeriano E. Fugoso Memorial School
 Antonio A. Maceda Integrated School (formerly Vicente Orestes Romualdez Integrated School)
 Carlos L. Albert High School (CLAHS)

District V
 Aurora A. Quezon Elementary School
 Dr. Celedonio A. Salvador Elementary School
 Epifanio de los Santos Elementary School
 Fernando Ma. Guerrero Elementary School
 Herminigildo J. Atienza Elementary School
 Justo Lukban Elementary School
 Margarita Roxas de Ayala Elementary School
 Rafael Palma Elementary School
 Sen. Benigno Aquino Jr. Elementary School
 Silahis ng Katarungan Special School
 Manuel G. Araullo High School
 Manuel A. Roxas High School
 Manila High School
 Manila Science High School
 Ignacio Villamor High School
 Pres. Corazon C. Aquino High School

District VI
 Bacood Elementary School
 Bagong Barangay Elementary School
 Bagong Diwa Elementary School
 Beata Elementary School
 Fernando Amorsolo Elementary School
 Geronimo Santiago Elementary School
 Pio del Pilar Elementary School
 Sta. Ana Elementary School
 Tomas Earnshaw Elementary School
 Jacinto Zamora Elementary School
 Victorino Mapa High School
 Mariano Marcos Memorial High School
 Elpidio Quirino High School
 Carlos P. Garcia High School
 Eulogio Rodriguez Vocational High School
 Gen. Emilio Aguinaldo Integrated School

Public colleges and universities
 Eulogio "Amang" Rodriguez Institute of Science and Technology
 Pamantasan ng Lungsod ng Maynila
 Philippine Normal University
 Polytechnic University of the Philippines
 Technological University of the Philippines
 Universidad de Manila (a.k.a. Gat Andrés Bonifacio University)
 University of the Philippines Manila

References

Department of Education (Philippines)
Schools in Manila